John Davidson (December 25, 1886 – January 16, 1968) was an American stage and film actor. He appeared in more than 140 films between 1915 and 1963. He was born in New York, New York and died in Los Angeles, California.

Selected filmography

 The Wonderful Adventure (1915) - M. Cheivasse
 The Green Cloak (1915) - Paul Duncan
 The Sentimental Lady (1915) - Norman Van Aulsten
 The Danger Signal (1915) - Rodman Cadbury
 Man and His Soul (1916) - Stephen Might Jr.
 The Red Mouse (1916)
 The Pawn of Fate (1916) - André Lesar
 The Wall Between (1916) - Capt. Burkett
 A Million A Minute (1916) - Duke de Reves
 Romeo and Juliet (1916) - Paris
 The Brand of Cowardice (1916) - Navarete
The Power of Decision (1917) - Wood Harding
 The Beautiful Lie (1917) - Howard Hayes
 Souls Adrift (1917) - Maberly Todd
 The Wild Girl (1917) - Minor Role
 The Awakening (1917) - Horace Chapron
 Shame (1917) - Cabaret Dancer
 The Spurs of Sybil (1918) - Paul Berwick
 The Winning of Beatrice (1918) - John Maddox Jr.
 The Grouch (1918) - Narciso
 The Bluffer (1919) - Edmond Curtiss
 The Stronger Vow (1919) - José de Cordova
 Through the Toils (1919) - Walter Tressler
 Forest Rivals (1919) - Pierre Dubois
 The Black Circle (1919) - Jim Garvin
 The Genius Pierre (1919)
 Romance (1920) - Beppo
 A Woman's Business (1920)
 The Tiger's Cub (1920) - Lone Wolf
 The Great Lover (1920) - Sonino
 Cheated Love (1921) - Mischa Grossman
 The Bronze Bell (1921) - Salig Singh
 No Woman Knows (1921) - Theodore Brandeis
 Fool's Paradise (1921) - Prince Talaat-Ni
 The Idle Rich (1921) - Dillingham Coolidge
 Saturday Night (1922) - The Count Demitry Scardoff
 The Woman Who Walked Alone (1922) - Otis Yeardley
 Under Two Flags (1922) - Sheik Ben Ali Hammed
 His Children's Children (1923) - Florian
 Monsieur Beaucaire (1924) - Richelieu
 Ramshackle House (1924) - Ernest Riever
 The Rescue (1929) - Hassim
 Kid Gloves (1929) - Stone
 Queen of the Night Clubs (1929) - Don Holland
 Honky Tonk (1929) - Trailer Host (uncredited)
 The Time, the Place and the Girl (1929) - Pete Ward
 Skin Deep (1929) - Blackie Culver
 The Thirteenth Chair (1929) - Edward Wales
 The Life of the Party (1930) - Mr. Smith
 Docks of San Francisco (1932) - Vance
 Arsène Lupin (1932) - Gourney-Martin's Butler
 Grand Hotel (1932) - Hotel Manager (uncredited)
 Jewel Robbery (1932) - Robbery Accomplice (uncredited)
 Blondie of the Follies (1932) - Party Guest (uncredited)
 Six Hours to Live (1932) - Kellner
Behind Jury Doors (1932) - George Fisher
 Broadway Bad (1933) - The Prince (uncredited)
 Oliver Twist (1933) - (uncredited)
 Gabriel Over the White House (1933) - Delegate to the Debt Conference (uncredited)
 Reunion in Vienna (1933) - Police Officer (uncredited)
 The Devil's in Love (1933) - Kasim - Native (uncredited)
 Dinner at Eight (1933) - Mr. Hatfield
 Ladies Must Love (1933) - One of Bill's Friends (uncredited)
 The Mad Game (1933) - Doctor
 The Perils of Pauline (1933) - Dr. Bashan
 Bombay Mail (1934) - R. Xavier
 Hold That Girl (1934) - Ackroyd
 Viva Villa! (1934) - Gen. Lopez (uncredited)
 Stand Up and Cheer! (1934) - Blue Nose Hour Radio Announcer (voice, uncredited)
 The Scarlet Empress (1934) - Marquis de la Chetardie (uncredited)
 Murder in Trinidad (1934) - Gookol Moah
 Burn 'Em Up Barnes (1934, Serial) - Tom Chase - Race Car Henchman [Chs. 1-2, 5] (uncredited)
 Hollywood Mystery (1934) - Siegfried Sonoff
 The Moonstone (1934) - Yandoo
 Tailspin Tommy (1934, Serial) - Wade 'Tiger' Taggart
 A Shot in the Dark (1935) - Prof. Brand
 Behind the Green Lights (1935) - Beasley
 The Call of the Savage (1935, Serial) - Prince Samu [Chs. 11-12]
 Reckless (1935) - Sid - Mona's Lawyer (uncredited)
 Charlie Chan in Egypt (1935) - Chemist Daoud Atrash
 Death from a Distance (1935) - Ahmad Haidru
 The Last Days of Pompeii (1935) - Phoebus - Runaway Slave
 A Tale of Two Cities (1935) - Morveau
 Mummy's Boys (1936) - Cafe Manager in Cairo (uncredited)
 Confession (1937) - Actor (uncredited)
 Jungle Menace (1937, Serial) - Dr. Coleman
 Live, Love and Learn (1937) - Mr. Wingate (uncredited)
 The Fighting Devil Dogs (1938, Serial) - Lin Wing [Ch. 1]
 Storm Over Bengal (1938) - Aide to Ramin Khan (uncredited)
 Sharpshooters (1938) - Stableman (uncredited)
 Arrest Bulldog Drummond (1938) - Gumba - Bird Seller (uncredited)
 Mr. Moto's Last Warning (1939) - Hakin
 Duel Personalities (1939, Short) - Prof. William Delmore (hypnotist) (uncredited)
 Mr. Moto Takes a Vacation (1939) - Prince Suleid
 Miracles for Sale (1939) - Weird Voice (voice, uncredited)
 Saps at Sea (1940) - (uncredited)
 Turnabout (1940) - Nightclub Patron (uncredited)
 King of the Royal Mounted (1940, Serial) - Shelton [Chs 4, 5]
 The Great Dictator (1940) - Hospital Superintendent (uncredited)
 The Devil Bat (1940) - Prof. Raines
 Adventures of Captain Marvel (1941, Serial) - Tal Chotali
 Singapore Woman (1941) - (uncredited)
 Dick Tracy vs Crime Inc (1941) - Lucifer
 Perils of Nyoka (1942, Serial) - Lhoba - Tuareg High Priest [Chs.4-7,12-13]
 Secret Service in Darkest Africa (1943, Serial) - Sheik [Ch. 2] (uncredited)
 Captain America (1944, Serial) - Gruber
 Bermuda Mystery (1944) - Superintendent (uncredited)
 The Chinese Cat (1944) - Carl Karzdas / Kurt Karzdas
 Call of the Jungle (1944) - Harley
 Wilson Princeton Team Doctor (uncredited)
 Circumstantial Evidence (1945) - Lawyer (uncredited)
 Where Do We Go from Here? (1945) - Gen. Benedict Arnold (uncredited)
 Captain Eddie (1945) - Reporter (uncredited)
 Easy to Look At (1945) - Drunk (uncredited)
 The Purple Monster Strikes (1945, Serial) - Emperor of Mars [Chs. 2, 10-11]
 Shock (1946) - Mr. Edwards (uncredited)
 Smooth as Silk (1946) - Sam (uncredited)
 Sentimental Journey (1946) - Floorwalker (uncredited)
 The Razor's Edge (1946) - Banker (uncredited)
 Suddenly It's Spring (1947) - Elevator Passenger (uncredited)
 Daisy Kenyon (1947) - Mervyn, O'Mara's Butler (uncredited)
 The Iron Curtain (1948) - Secretary to the Minister of Justice (uncredited)
 One Touch of Venus (1948) - Customer (uncredited)
 The Luck of the Irish (1948) - Reporter (uncredited)
 Bungalow 13 (1948) - Mr. Eden
 That Wonderful Urge (1948) - Whitson's Butler (uncredited)
 A Letter to Three Wives (1949) - John (uncredited)
 You're My Everything (1949) - Headwaiter (uncredited)
 Slattery's Hurricane (1949) - Maitre D' (uncredited)
 Oh, You Beautiful Doll (1949) - Davis - Steiner's Secretary (uncredited)
 Dancing in the Dark (1949) - Board Member (uncredited)
 The Sword of Monte Cristo (1951) - Artist
 Katie Did It (1951) - Minor Role (uncredited)
 Half Angel (1951) - Best Man (uncredited)
 People Will Talk (1951) - Faculty Board Member (uncredited)
 Golden Girl (1951) - Croupier (uncredited)
 The Cimarron Kid (1952) - Minor Role (uncredited)
 Untamed Frontier (1952) - Townsman (uncredited)
 Thunder in the East (1953) - Hotel Clerk (uncredited)
 Prince Valiant (1954) - Patriarch (uncredited)
 Around the World in 80 Days (1956) - Extra (uncredited)
 Stranger in My Arms (1959) - Minor Role (uncredited)
 A Gathering of Eagles (1963) - Hadley - S.A.C. Observer (uncredited)

References

External links

1886 births
1968 deaths
American male film actors
American male silent film actors
Male actors from New York City
20th-century American male actors